The Platinum Collection is a 2009 box set by the ambient musical project Enigma. It contains three CDs - the first CD comprises the band's most popular tracks from previous years, the second CD consists of remixes, and the third CD contains previously unreleased tracks composed and produced by Michael Cretu. The cover image shows the Lady with an Ermine (Cecilia Gallerani) as painted ca. 1489–1491 by Leonardo da Vinci.

Track listing

Disc 1

Disc 2

Disc 3

Charts

Reception
allmusic

References

2009 compilation albums
Enigma (German band) albums
Virgin Records compilation albums